Psechridae is a family of 	araneomorph spiders with about 70 species in two genera.

The family belongs to the RTA clade of spiders because they all have a Retrolateral Tibial Apophysis on the male pedipalp.
A recent phylogenetic analysis places Psechridae as close relatives of the lynx spiders, wolf spiders, and nursery web spiders.

They feature several characteristics normally found in ecribellate spiders, for example brood care behavior, and a colulus with no apparent function. They have greatly elongated legs, with the last element being very flexible. Female Psechrus carry their egg-sac in the chelicerae, similar to their relatives, the ecribellate Pisauridae. Members of Psechrus construct horizontal webs lace webs, while Fecenia construct pseudo-orbs, similar to orb webs of Orbiculariae spiders in an example of evolutionary convergence.

Distribution
They occur in southeastern Asia, ranging from India in the west, to Solomon Islands in the east, reaching as far south as northern Australia, and north to central China. They are found in forest, rocky areas, and caves from lowlands to altitudes exceeding .

Genera

, the World Spider Catalog accepts the following genera:

Fecenia Simon, 1887 — Asia, Australia
Psechrus Thorell, 1878 — Asia, Australia
 †Eomatachia Petrunkevitch, 1942 (fossil, oligocene)

See also
 List of Psechridae species

References

Further reading
 Levi, H.W. (1982). The spider genera Psechrus and Fecenia (Araneae, Psechridae). Pacific Insects 24: 114-138. - revision of the family
 Wang, X.P. &  Yin, C.M. (2001). A review of the Chinese Psechridae (Araneae). J. Arachnol. 29: 330-344.  PDF

 
Cave spiders
Araneomorphae families